Geneva Downtown Commercial Historic District is a national historic district located at Geneva, Ontario County, New York.  It encompasses 83 contributing buildings in the central business district of Geneva.  They were built between about 1840 and 1940, and include notable examples of Greek Revival, Italianate, Romanesque Revival, Colonial Revival, and Art Deco style commercial architecture.  Located in the district are the separately listed Farmers and Merchants Bank, Smith's Opera House, and United States Post Office.  Other notable buildings include the Prouty Block (1876), YMCA (1902), Wheat Building (1904), Guard Building (1917, 1924), Geneva City Hall (1913, 1940), Odd Fellows Building (1884-1890), and Kresge Building (1928).

It was listed on the National Register of Historic Places in 2014.

References

External links

Historic districts on the National Register of Historic Places in New York (state)
Commercial buildings on the National Register of Historic Places in New York (state)
Greek Revival architecture in New York (state)
Italianate architecture in New York (state)
Romanesque Revival architecture in New York (state)
Colonial Revival architecture in New York (state)
Art Deco architecture in New York (state)
Buildings and structures in Ontario County, New York
Geneva, New York
National Register of Historic Places in Ontario County, New York